Latif-ur Rehman (1 January 1929 – 27 February 1987), also known as Latifur Rehman, was a field hockey player who competed internationally for India and Pakistan. He won a gold medal as a member of India's team at the 1948 Summer Olympics and a silver medal playing for Pakistan at the 1956 Summer Olympics.

References

External links
 

1929 births
1987 deaths
Sportspeople from Indore
Field hockey players from Madhya Pradesh
Indian emigrants to Pakistan
Muhajir people
Pakistani male field hockey players
Indian male field hockey players
Olympic field hockey players of India
Olympic field hockey players of Pakistan
Field hockey players at the 1948 Summer Olympics
Field hockey players at the 1956 Summer Olympics
Olympic gold medalists for India
Olympic silver medalists for Pakistan
Field hockey players at the 1952 Summer Olympics
Olympic medalists in field hockey
Asian Games medalists in field hockey
Field hockey players at the 1958 Asian Games
Medalists at the 1956 Summer Olympics
Medalists at the 1948 Summer Olympics
Asian Games gold medalists for Pakistan
Medalists at the 1958 Asian Games